Black Sunday is the collaboration album by American rapper and producer Sutter Kain with Donnie Darko, released in 2005. If album is bought via iTunes Track 8 Is "Disciples of Death feat Young Vadah".

Track listing

Samples 

"The Making Of..." contains  samples of "In Chiesa" as performed by Francis Lai And "Snow Frolic" as performed by Francis Lai and Danielle Licari
"Cannibal Holocaust" contains a sample of "Search for Jenny" as performed by Francis Lai
"Lord of the Flies" contains a sample of "Bozo Barrett (Theme From Love Story)" as performed by Francis Lai
"Death Valley" contains a sample of "The End of Everything" as performed by Trivium
"In the Mouth of Madness" contains a sample of "Medusa And Hemlock" as performed by Cradle of Filth
"Slaughter House" contains a sample of "Milligram Smile" as performed by From Autumn to Ashes
"Kain Made Me Do It" contains a sample of "Cherry Kiss" as performed by From Autumn to Ashes
"Disciples of Death" contains a sample of "While My Guitar Gently Weeps" by Jimmy Ponder and "A Divine Image" by David Axelrod
"Outta My Mind" contains a sample of "Each Day Is a Lifetime" as performed by David Ruffin
"I Just Can't Move On" contains a sample of "I'm Searching for a Love" as performed by Harold Melvin & The Blue Notes
"Loser" contains a sample of "I (Who Have Nothing)" as performed by Tom Jones
"Sympathy for Mr. Vengeance (Loser Pt. 2)" contains a sample of "Chi Mai" as performed by Ennio Morricone
"Black Sunday" contains a sample of "La Chanson De Slogan" as performed by Serge Gainsbourg And Jane Birkin
"Spit In Your Grave" contains a sample of "Falling to Grey" as performed by Trivium

2005 albums
Horrorcore albums